Shine On is the seventh studio album by Los Angeles, California -based band, L.T.D., released in 1980 on the A&M label. This was the last album to feature frontman Jeffrey Osborne, as he quit the group to start a solo career a year later.

Commercial performance
The album peaked at No. 6 on the R&B albums chart. It also reached No. 28 on the Billboard 200. The album features the singles "Where Did We Go Wrong", which peaked at No. 7 on the Hot Soul Singles chart, and the title track, which charted at No. 40 on the Billboard Hot 100 and No. 19 on the Hot Soul Singles chart.

Track listing

Personnel
Alvino M. Bennett – acoustic drums, percussion
Lorenzo Carnegie – alto saxophone, tenor saxophone, percussion
Henry E. Davis – bass, synthesizer, piccolo, background vocals
Jimmie Davis – acoustic piano, electric piano, clavinet, synthesizer, background vocals
John T. McGhee – acoustic guitar, electric guitar
Abraham "Onion" Miller, Jr. – tenor saxophone
Jeffrey Osborne – lead vocals, background vocals, percussion
Billy Osborne – acoustic piano, electric piano, lead vocals, background vocals, percussion
Jake Riley – trombone
Carle W. Vickers – trumpet, flugelhorn, flute

Guest musicians
Sneaky Pete Kleinow – steel guitar
Mark Cargill – concertmaster
David M. Sherr – oboe
Sidney Muldrow, Attilio De Palma – French horn
Angela Winbush – background vocals

Charts
Album

Singles

References

External links
 

1980 albums
L.T.D. (band) albums
Albums produced by Bobby Martin
Albums arranged by Bobby Martin
A&M Records albums